eSvn is a free and open source Subversion client which is released under the GPLv2 License. It provides an interface to perform the most common revision control operations as a standalone GUI. It is written with the Qt GUI toolkit.

See also

 Subversion - an open-source application used for revision control
 Comparison of Subversion clients

References

External links
 Official website
 Project on Sourceforge

Apache Subversion
Software that uses Qt